Marriage Sanitarium (German: Ehesanatorium) is a 1955 Austrian comedy film directed by Franz Antel and starring Adrian Hoven, Maria Emo and Margit Saad.

It was shot at the Sievering and Schönbrunn Studios in Vienna. The film's sets were designed by the art director Fritz Jüptner-Jonstorff.

Plot
A young reporter and his photographer colleague desperately try and get some pictures of a famous but reclusive circulatory specialist that their publisher has demanded. They then take on the challenge of infiltrating a famous sanatorium known to help cure marriage problems.

Cast
Adrian Hoven as Stefan Seidlitz, Journalist
Maria Emo as Franziska Kaub
Margit Saad as Rita Keller
Hans Moser as Meisel
Paul Hörbiger as Professor Thomas Eschenburg
Gunther Philipp as Fritz Keller, Pressefotograf
Oskar Sima as Director Lehmann
Christl Mardayn as Elisabeth Kaub - publisher
Annie Rosar as Laura Hübner
Susi Nicoletti as Amanda Dietze
Adrienne Gessner as Mrs. Lehmann
Rudolf Carl as commissionaire
Kurt Nachmann as Director Rudolf Burg
Ernst Waldbrunn as Mr. Dietze
Peter Gerhard as Mr. Hübner
Helli Servi as Paula Kunz
Franz Böheim as Mr. Zagel
Raoul Retzer as Mr. Kunz
Fritz Eckhardt as Mr. Rübsam
Hannerl Melcher as model

References

External links

Austrian comedy films
1955 comedy films
Films directed by Franz Antel
Films shot at Sievering Studios
Films shot at Schönbrunn Studios
Austrian black-and-white films